Carlos Daniel Serrano Zárate (born August 17, 1998, in Bucaramanga) is a Paralympic swimmer from Colombia.

Career
He competed in the 2016 Summer Paralympics and won a gold, a silver and a bronze medal. In 2018, he was nominated for the Americas Paralympic Committee Athlete of the Year prize.

References

1998 births
People from Bucaramanga
Medalists at the 2016 Summer Paralympics
Swimmers at the 2016 Summer Paralympics
Living people
Medalists at the World Para Swimming Championships
Paralympic medalists in swimming
Paralympic gold medalists for Colombia
Paralympic silver medalists for Colombia
Paralympic bronze medalists for Colombia
Paralympic swimmers of Colombia
Medalists at the 2015 Parapan American Games
Medalists at the 2019 Parapan American Games
Swimmers at the 2020 Summer Paralympics
S7-classified Paralympic swimmers
Sportspeople from Santander Department
21st-century Colombian people